This page describes the European zone qualifying procedure for the 2011 World Men's Handball Championship.

Qualification system

Seeding 
The draw for the qualification round was held on 6 August 2009 at the EHF headquarters, in Vienna. Sweden (host nation), and France (defending champion), are directly qualified. The top 3 participants at the 2010 European Men's Handball Championship, excluding Sweden and France will also qualify for the final tournament, while the other 11 participants are guaranteed a place in the play-off Round. The remaining 23 teams were divided into several pots according to their positions in the 2010 European Men's Handball Championship qualification, and were successfully drawn so that each qualification group contained one team from pots 1 to 3. Groups 1 and 2 will also comprise one team from pot 4.

Playing dates
Qualification Round: 15, 16 and 17 January 2010
Play-off Round: 12/13 and 19/20 June 2010

Tiebreakers
If two or more teams are equal on points on completion of the group matches, the following criteria are applied to determine the rankings.
 Higher number of points obtained in the group matches played among the teams in question.
 Superior goal difference from the group matches played among the teams in question.
 Higher number of goals scored in the group matches played among the teams in question.
 If, after applying criteria 1) to 3) to several teams, two or more teams still have an equal ranking, the criteria 1) to 3) will be reapplied to determine the ranking of these teams. If this procedure does not lead to a decision, criteria 5), 6) and 7) will apply.
 Superior goal difference from all group matches played.
 Higher number of goals scored in all group matches played.
 Drawing of lots.

Qualification Round 

Each group will take place on the court of the third seeded team. In case the third seeded team can't organize the qualification tournament, the first seed will take its place. The winner of each group qualifies for the play-off matches, which will be played on 12/13 June and 19/20 June 2010.

Group 1

Group 2

Group 3

Group 4

Group 5

Group 6

Group 7

Play-off Round 

Will take place on the 12/13 June and 19/20 June 2010. It will comprise 18 teams overall:
 11 teams from the 2010 European Men's Handball Championship.

The draw for the play-off Round will take place on 31 January 2010, in Vienna. Seeding will be based on teams appearance and record on 2010 European Men's Handball Championship.

Draw Procedure 

Step 1: 1 ball of pot 2 is drawn to pot 1 and two balls of pot 2 are drawn to pot 3 (the balls will not be opened).
Step 2: One team of pot 1 is drawn against one team of pot 3 (9 times). For each pairing the home and away right will be drawn.

Play-offs 

|}

First Leg

Second Leg

References 

World Mens Handball Championship European Qualification, 2011
World Handball Championship tournaments
Qualification for handball competitions